Duisburg-Buchholz station is a station in the suburb of Buchholz of the city of Duisburg in the German state of North Rhine-Westphalia. It is on the Cologne–Duisburg railway and it is classified by Deutsche Bahn as a category 4 station. The station was opened in 1970 or 1971.

The station is served by Rhine-Ruhr S-Bahn line S 1 (Dortmund–Solingen) on week days every 30 minutes during the day between Essen and Düsseldorf.

It is also served by two bus routes operated by Duisburger Verkehrsgesellschaft at 30-minute intervals: 934 and 940.

References

Rhine-Ruhr S-Bahn stations
S1 (Rhine-Ruhr S-Bahn)
Buildings and structures in Duisburg
Transport in Duisburg
Railway stations in Germany opened in 1970
Railway stations in Germany opened in 1971